The 1988 Ohio Valley Conference men's basketball tournament was the final event of the 1987–88 season in the Ohio Valley Conference. The tournament was held March 7–9, 1988, at Racer Arena in Murray, Kentucky.

Murray State defeated  in the championship game, 73–70, to win their third OVC men's basketball tournament.

The Racers received an automatic bid to the 1988 NCAA tournament as the No. 14 seed in the Midwest region.

Bracket

References

Ohio Valley Conference men's basketball tournament
Tournament
Ohio Valley Conference men's basketball tournament
Ohio Valley Conference men's basketball tournament